Barbara Göbel (born 8 April 1943) is a German former swimmer who won a bronze medal at the 1960 Summer Olympics in the 200 m breaststroke event.

At the 1962 European Aquatics Championships, she won a gold medal in the 4 × 100 m medley relay, setting the new world record. For this achievement, the relay team members were named German Sportspersonalities of the Year in the team category in 1962.

References

1943 births
Living people
Sportspeople from Jena
German female swimmers
German female breaststroke swimmers
Olympic swimmers of the United Team of Germany
Swimmers at the 1960 Summer Olympics
Olympic bronze medalists for the United Team of Germany
Olympic bronze medalists in swimming
European Aquatics Championships medalists in swimming
Medalists at the 1960 Summer Olympics
Recipients of the Patriotic Order of Merit in silver